William Tennant (12 July 1865 – 6 December 1927) was an English professional footballer who played as a goalkeeper.

References

1865 births
1927 deaths
Footballers from Wolverhampton
English footballers
Association football goalkeepers
Willenhall F.C. players
Hartshill Unity F.C. players
Wolverhampton Wanderers F.C. players
Walsall F.C. players
Grimsby Town F.C. players
English Football League players
FA Cup Final players